Metalobosia varda is a moth of the subfamily Arctiinae. It was described by Schaus in 1896. It is found in the Brazilian states of São Paulo and Paraná.

References

Lithosiini
Moths described in 1896